M. M. Joshi may refer to:

 Murli Manohar Joshi (born 1934), Indian politician and physicist
 M. M. Joshi (ophthalmologist) (born 1935), Indian ophthalmologist